Cannabis in Manitoba became legal when the national Cannabis Act went into force on October 17, 2018.

Legalization
In December 2017, Manitoba introduced the Safe and Responsible Retailing of Cannabis Act, detailing their plans for recreational cannabis use and sales. The age for use would be set at 19, and communities would be allowed to opt-out of cannabis sales by plebiscite. Home-growing of cannabis would be prohibited. Manitoba Liquor and Lotteries would source all cannabis to retailers, where it would be sold in private-sector stores.

By the time recreational marijuana was legal in Canada, Manitoba had firmed up its rules. The minimum age is 19, cannabis must not be smoked or vaped in public, home growing is not legal and individuals may carry up to 30 grams of cannabis while in public. Purchases can be made on-line or at the provincially licensed retail stores operated by private enterprise companies.

In October 2019, Premier Brian Pallister announced plans to ban consumption of edibles in public in Manitoba by December.

Manitoba First Nations
Three nations in Manitoba, Opaskwayak Cree Nation, Long Plain First Nation, and Peguis First Nation, formed an alliance with National Access Cannabis in 2016, seeking to gain profit for their communities from legalization, and lobby for their interests on issues such as tax rebates for cannabis sold on reserves.

Industrial hemp
Commercial cultivation of industrial cannabis was banned in Canada in 1938, but as of 1928 1,640 acres of cannabis were grown in Canada, with 1,200 of those acres being in Portage la Prairie, Manitoba.

Usage
In 2013, 11.5 percent of residents reported that they consumed cannabis in the past twelve months, the fifth highest in the country. In 2017, Statistics Canada reported that the province had the fifth lowest per capita usage in the country of 18.31 grams per person.

See also
 Cannabis in Canada

References

External links
THE SAFE AND RESPONSIBLE RETAILING OF CANNABIS ACT (LIQUOR AND GAMING CONTROL ACT AND MANITOBA LIQUOR AND LOTTERIES CORPORATION ACT AMENDED)

 
Manitoba law